This is the list of all AGF's European matches.

European Champion Clubs' Cup / UEFA Champions League

UEFA Cup / UEFA Europa League

UEFA Europa Conference League

UEFA Cup Winners' Cup

References

Aarhus Gymnastikforening 
Danish football clubs in international competitions